Brett Blundy (born 1959/1960) is an Australian billionaire businessman. He is the founder and former chairman of BB Retail Capital, which owns companies such as Sanity Entertainment, Bras N Things, and Aventus Property Group. He is part-owner of BridgeClimb Sydney, one of Australia's biggest tourist attractions. In 2015 Blundy expanded his business operations into cattle farming.

Career 
BB Retail Capital (BBRC) was founded by Blundy in 1980 with the purchase of a single record store "Disco Duck", now known as Sanity Entertainment Group.

In 2005, he purchased Diva, a fashion jewellery store founded by Colette and Mark Hayman. Diva had close to 200 stores in Australia and New Zealand and 400 in international markets.

In 2010, he launched Lovisa Jewellery, a fast fashion jewellery brand. As of November 2022, Lovisa has 676 stores across 26 countries.

In early 2018, Bras N Things was sold to the US company Hanes.

Personal life
He is married, with two children, and lives in Singapore.

Blundy owns a  megayacht, Cloud 9.

Net worth

References

External links

Living people
Year of birth missing (living people)
Australian businesspeople
Australian billionaires